The 2008–09 Purdue Boilermakers men's basketball team represented Purdue University. The head coach was Matt Painter, then in his 4th season with the Boilers. The team played its home games in Mackey Arena in West Lafayette, Indiana, and is a member of the Big Ten Conference.  The Boilermakers finished tied for second in the conference's regular season, and captured their first Big Ten tournament crown, defeating Ohio State 65–61 in the final game.  In the NCAA tournament, the Boilers reached the Sweet Sixteen for the first time since 2000, where they fell to the Connecticut Huskies.

Season Notes
 On November 14, 2008, Purdue set a school record in the first game of the season against Detroit with only 3 turnovers in a game. The prior record was set during the 1969 NCAA tournament championship game against UCLA.
 By playing three games in their conference tournament championship and three games in the NCAA Tournament giving the Boilers a total of 37 games, Purdue played more games in the 2008–09 season than any other season in the program's history.
 Keaton Grant, Marcus Green, JaJuan Johnson and E'Twaun Moore hold the school record for most games played in a season with 37 each.
 Although opening his first season as Purdue's head coach with only 9 wins, Matt Painter collected more wins in his first four seasons (2005–2009) than Gene Keady's (1980–1984) 82, with 83.
 Senior forward Marcus Green set a school record with career games as a Boiler (2005–2009) with 183, breaking Brian Cardinal and Mike Robinson's 182 mark.
 Freshman guard Lewis Jackson set the Freshman record with most games played in a Freshman season with 36.
 JaJuan Johnson was named First Team All-Big Ten.
 Lewis Jackson became the fourth Boilermaker in three years to be named to the Big Ten All-Freshman Team.

Roster

Incoming Recruits

Schedule 

|-
!colspan=12 style=|Exhibition

|-
!colspan=12 style=|Regular season

|-
!colspan=12 style=|Big Ten tournament

|-
!colspan=12 style=|NCAA tournament

Rankings

See also
2009 NCAA Division I men's basketball tournament
2008-09 NCAA Division I men's basketball season
2008-09 NCAA Division I men's basketball rankings
List of NCAA Division I institutions

References

Purdue
Purdue Boilermakers men's basketball seasons
Purdue
Big Ten men's basketball tournament championship seasons
Purd
Purd